Albert "Abbie" Shadbolt (29 May 1887 – 13 July1971) was a New Zealand rugby union and professional rugby league footballer who played representative rugby league (RL) for New Zealand.

Early life
Albert Edward Shadbolt was born on May 28, 1887, in Whanganui. His father was also named Albert Edward Shadbolt and his mother was Jessie McIntosh. His father was on the Foxton Borough Council in the early part of the century and stood for mayor in 1907. he had originally been from Akaroa, in Canterbury before moving to Wellington where he learned the butchery trade and opened a butchery in Foxton. He sold this business in 1906 and bought the Manawatu Hotel. Albert senior was heavily involved in sports, particularly the New Zealand Athletic Association which he was vice-president of.

Playing career
Shadbolt originally began playing rugby in the Wellington area. He played for Athletic in the 1908 season and made the Wellington side after being selected for the Wellington B team prior but not being able to play. He played in matches against Canterbury, Manawatu, Taranaki, and Otago. In the 1909 season he switched to the Poneke club and was selected to play for Wellington against Wanganui but was transferred to Christchurch for work prior to the game. After he moved to Christchurch he joined the Merivale club. There he was alongside fellow future New Zealand rugby league international Bill Mitchell. He represented Canterbury XV in 1909 and 1910.

In 1912 Shadbolt switched codes and was part of the first ever Canterbury rugby league side. Canterbury went down 4–5 to Wellington on 7 September.

In 1913 Shadbolt played for St Albans in the new Canterbury Rugby League competition and again played for Canterbury. He was selected in the New Zealand side that toured Australia and played against New South Wales during the season. He didn't play for several years but resumed playing in 1920 when he joined the Federal club, and he played for Canterbury in the same season. In 1921 Shadbolt toured Australia for New Zealand under coach Jim Rukutai.

After retirement Shadbolt served as a referee.

Personal life
He married Eleanor Kermode Radcliffe on January 11, 1911. They had 5 children: Verona Althea (b.1911), Rawene (b.1914), Christina Eileen (b.1915), Peggie (b.1919), and Owen Radcliffe (b.1921). He separated from his wife and remarried in 1926 to Catherine Gertrude Thomas. Albert died in 1971 in Trentham, Upper Hutt.

References

Manawatu rugby union players
Wellington rugby union players
New Zealand rugby league players
New Zealand national rugby league team players
Canterbury rugby league team players
Rugby league locks
New Zealand rugby league referees
Canterbury rugby union players
New Zealand rugby union players
Place of birth missing
Place of death missing
1887 births
1971 deaths